The East Midlands Universities Air Squadron (EMUAS) is the Nottinghamshire-centred University Air Squadron for the East Midlands.

History
It was formed on 26 February 1941 as University College Nottingham Air Squadron then became Nottingham University Air Squadron in 1948; the unit's regalia has consequent echoes of Robin Hood.

In the 1950s there were 17 university air squadrons. With the advent of ground-breaking jet aircraft in the 1960s, places for the unit were much sought after. In November 1967 the unit took its present name, to include the University of Leicester and Loughborough University. It held its annual dinner at the University of Nottingham., often with one of the university vice-chancellors present.

Structure

Training is delivered by No. 6 Flying Training School RAF in south Lincolnshire, off the A17, also the home of the Central Flying School (CFS) where all UK military pilots first train.

Previous to 2001, training was in Nottinghamshire. It takes around 35 students a year, from September to early October. The unit has 8 staff, and meets each week, close to the west entrance of the University of Nottingham.

Alumni
 Flt Lt Jon Bond from Epping in Essex, Red Arrows pilot 2018–2021, Air Transport Management at Loughborough University in 2005, joined the RAF in 2007
 Flt Lt Sean Cunningham, Red Arrows pilot

See also
 List of Royal Air Force aircraft squadrons

References

External links
 EMUAS

1941 establishments in England
U
Education in Lincolnshire
Loughborough University
Military units and formations established in 1941
North Kesteven District
Organisations based in Lincolnshire
Organisations based in Nottinghamshire
Royal Air Force university air squadrons
University of Leicester
University of Nottingham